Sant'Andrea is Roman Catholic church in Montecarlo, province of Lucca, region of Tuscany, Italy.

History
The church was erected from 1332 to 1334, adjacent to the fortress protecting the newly founded town. The former town of Vivinaia had been razed by the Florentines, and when its former inhabitants moved to this locale, they erected this church dedicated to the same saint of their prior church in their prior neighborhood. It was immediately granted the permission to baptize, a function then withdrawn from the parish church of San Piero in Campo.

The exterior facade is made of stone in the lower register, and brick superiorly. The bell-tower was built later. The interior was refurbished in 1783, and has three naves, with lateral chapels. The Chapel of the Rosary houses the parish museum and has a canvas depicting the Madonna and Child (1434) by Francesco Anguilla and a statue of St Anthony Abbot (circa 1410). The Chapel of the Madonna del Soccorso has a venerated 15th-century fresco depicting the Virgin saving a child from the grip of the devil. The crypt causes the presbytery to be elevated relative to the rest of the nave. The main altar shelters the relics of San Vincenzino, transferred here from the Catacombs of Santa Ciriaca in Rome.

References

13th-century Roman Catholic church buildings in Italy
Roman Catholic churches in Tuscany